Waitrose & Partners (formally Waitrose Limited) is a brand of British supermarkets, founded in 1904 as Waite, Rose & Taylor, later shortened to Waitrose. It was acquired in 1937 by employee-owned retailer John Lewis Partnership, which still sells groceries under the brand. Its head offices are located in Bracknell and Victoria, England. 

Waitrose & Partners has 332 shops across Great Britain and the Channel Islands, including 65 "little Waitrose" convenience shops, and a 5.1% share of the grocery market, making the company the twelfth-largest retailer of groceries in the UK. They also export products to 52 countries and have locations in the Middle East.

The chain has been described by The Daily Telegraph and The Guardian as having an "upmarket" reputation, although former managing director Mark Price suggested prices are competitive to Tesco, a mid-market chain. The company also had a royal warrant to supply groceries, wine, and spirits to Queen Elizabeth II and, as of 1 January 2011, to King Charles III.

History 
Founded in 1904 by Wallace Waite, Arthur Rose and David Taylor, Waitrose & Partners began as a small grocery, Waite, Rose & Taylor, in Acton, West London. In 1908, two years after David Taylor had left the business, the name "Waitrose", from the remaining founders' names, was adopted. In 1937, the company, consisting of ten shops and 160 employees, was taken over by the John Lewis Partnership. In 1944, the partnership purchased the South Essex grocery business Schofield and Martin, which had 12 shops in its chain.

In 1955, the chain opened its first Waitrose supermarket in Streatham, London, and continued to expand throughout London and the South East of England during the 1960s. In the 1970s, Waitrose opened branches in Hampshire, Bedfordshire, Essex, and Cambridgeshire.  On 16 June 2016 the shop's most southerly branch opened in Truro, Cornwall.

In the early 21st century, Waitrose continued its expansion, which included purchasing shops from Somerfield, Morrisons and Woolworths.

In 2009 the firm signed a deal with Alliance Boots which allowed Boots to operate branded pharmacies in Waitrose shops and Boots shops to sell Waitrose food products. The partnership between the companies ended in 2012 having been deemed unsuccessful, which led to Boots replacing Waitrose products with items from Irish retailer Musgrave's SuperValu chain.

Profitability issues at the end of the decade resulted in John Lewis announcing the closure of five Waitrose shops in 2018 and the sale of a further five Waitrose shops to other retailers in 2019.

Brand and marketing 

Waitrose sponsored Reading F.C. from 2008 to 2015, and the England cricket team for three years from 2013 to 2016.

In March 2010, Waitrose released a series of adverts, in print, online, and on national television, featuring celebrity chefs Delia Smith and Heston Blumenthal.

Waitrose Duchy Organic

In 1983 Waitrose became the first major supermarket chain to sell organic food, and by 2008 it had an 18% share of the organic food market. In September 2009, Duchy Originals, the struggling organic food business started by Prince Charles was rescued by Waitrose, which agreed to an exclusive deal to stock the range, and to pay a small fee to his charity. In return, Prince Charles visited Waitrose shops and dined with senior Waitrose executives and their spouses. In August 2010, the Duchy range was relaunched with many new lines under the Duchy Originals from Waitrose (later Waitrose Duchy Organic) brand.

Product ranges 
Essential Waitrose: Aware that Waitrose risked being seen as a food retailer for special occasions rather than everyday shopping, the chain launched its value range of products as "essential Waitrose" in March 2009. The marketing used the tagline: "Quality you'd expect at prices you wouldn't". 1,400 products were branded with this name using simple white-based packaging. Some people poked fun at the range for selling products that are not essential, such as ratatouille Provençal and limoncello desserts. Nevertheless, the range was highly successful. By 2016 it had over 2,000 items and £1.1 billion annual sales, making it one of only five food and drink brands in Britain worth over £1 billion.
No 1 Waitrose is a range of around 650 premium lines with grey packaging.
Cooks Ingredients are spices, herbs and related products with colourful packaging.
Heston for Waitrose is a range of prepared foods such as pies and cakes developed by Heston Blumenthal.

myWaitrose loyalty card 
In late 2011 the supermarket introduced its first loyalty card scheme, myWaitrose. It differed from supermarket loyalty schemes like Tesco Clubcard and Nectar, giving cardholders access to exclusive competitions and offers instead of allowing them to collect points.

It later began to give cardholders 10% off selected products, as well as free tea or coffee in store and money off their shopping for purchasing selected newspapers. Former Managing director Mark Price has said that this offer has made Waitrose the second largest provider of coffee in the UK, calling it a "phenomenal" response that showed schemes offering loyalty points to be meaningless. He told The Daily Telegraph: "Giving free coffee or free newspapers is disruptive to the market, but I think that is what customers want, I don't think they want a point. I mean, what is a point? I think it's meaningless. It doesn't have the richness, it doesn't have the affinity you can gauge if you engage with your customers in a different way. It is about what do consumers value today, not what did they value historically. So green shield stamps, or points, were a response to what happened post-war...I just don't think that is where the world is now."

The Daily Telegraph also later reported that Waitrose has faced "complaints from disgruntled middle-class shoppers who claim its free coffee offer is attracting the wrong kind of customer".

Price matching
In 2010, Waitrose began a price guarantee, matching prices of 1000 items with Tesco. In 2012, it extended this campaign to 7000 items.

Waitrose Kitchen magazine

In February 2015, Waitrose Kitchen magazine included an advertising pamphlet, "Taste of Israel", submitted by the Israeli government, in which traditional Arabic foods were referred to as Israeli. The advert prompted a social media backlash against Waitrose.

Corporate practices 

Waitrose and its related brands are owned by the John Lewis Partnership (JLP), which is itself owned by its employees, referred to within the organization as "partners." Employee shares are held in trust by the Partnership—their shares cannot be sold by the individual partners. The partners' economic rewards are achieved through the payment of bonuses, based on the JLP's annual profits. As such, they receive certain benefits, most notably the Partnership bonus, usually around 10–20% of a Partner's yearly salary in a lump sum paid in March (the highest bonus percentage in recent years has been 20%). However, during the coronavirus pandemic, Partnership bonus was suspended in both the 2020 and 2021 financial years, angering many Partners as they felt their hard work was not recognised.

Waitrose donates a portion of its profits to a group of charities on a proportional basis, whilst individual Waitrose branches manage their own charitable donations and local decisions are made on which charities are to be supported. This is a system called "Community Matters", where customers are invited to choose to whom they want money to be donated.

The supermarket launched the Waitrose Foundation in 2005, providing funds for education, worker facilities, and health services among other things for fruit growers in South Africa. This was expanded to Ghana and Kenya in 2009.

Shops 

Traditionally, Waitrose branches were largely concentrated in the south-east of England and Greater London; even as recently as 2003, its northernmost English branch was in Newark, Nottinghamshire. However, the company's expansion northwards and into Scotland since the mid-2000s has changed this significantly: the most northerly Waitrose shop is now located in Stirling, which opened in January 2013. Waitrose opened its 300th shop in Helensburgh on the River Clyde on 23 October 2013.

Waitrose shops vary considerably in size. For example, the smallest branch, little Waitrose at King's Cross station, London, occupies only  of retail space.

Some Waitrose shops incorporate an in-house restaurant selling hot and cold food sourced in the main from the shop. The myWaitrose card, which customers can obtain online, offers free hot drinks from the store's self-service machines with a purchase of goods; this  was withdrawn due to the COVID pandemic but as of February 2023 the coffee offer has returned.

Internationally, Waitrose holds a licensing agreement with Spinneys of Dubai, United Arab Emirates, which operate two purpose-built branches, of which the first opened in the Dubai Mall in October 2008.

Convenience shops and little Waitrose 

Announcing its foray into the convenience sector in July 2008, Waitrose opened its first convenience shop in Nottingham in December of that year. In September 2009, it was announced that a large scale rollout of the concept was planned, opening up to 300 shops in 5 to 10 years. The new arm will operate in a two-tier environment, with the majority of sites expected to trade from 2,500 to 3,000 sq ft and some trading from a larger 5,000–7,000 sq ft floor plate. A trial of a 'little Waitrose' fascia on smaller floor plate shops may yet lead to brand differentiation of some or all of the convenience estate.

Shell operates around 35 Little Waitrose stores at selected petrol stations owned by Shell in the UK.

Welcome Break 

In May 2009, Waitrose started a franchise deal with the motorway service station operator Welcome Break.

Online presence

Ocado
In April 2000, the online food retailer Ocado was launched, with the Ocado service being only available in certain areas of Britain. John Lewis Partnership came on board as a principal supplier and part owner in October 2000, although the relationship between the two began formally in January 2002. In August 2020, Waitrose announced they would cease operations with Ocado, which ended on 1 September 2020. Ocado partnered with Waitrose's rival store Marks & Spencer. Arrangements were amended in 2010 to a ten-year agreement to supply products to Ocado. In February 2011, John Lewis Pension trust divested itself of its Ocado shares.

Waitrose.com
Waitrose operates its own delivery service, Waitrose.com (previously WaitroseDeliver), which originally was only available in certain shops, delivering goods ordered through the internet and serviced from the local branch. Not to be confused with Ocado, which is an unrelated business, which formerly had a licence to distribute Waitrose items until 1 September 2020, when Waitrose ended its relationship with Ocado, to instead operate deliveries solely by itself from centralised fulfilment centres. As well as ordinary online groceries shopping, Waitrose.com also hosts the online ordering system for Waitrose's special order food and cakes service "Waitrose Entertaining". Waitrose became the first supermarket to abolish all delivery charges as of May 2009.

In October 2011, Waitrose opened a "Dotcom Fulfilment Centre" in Acton, West London, less than two miles from its original shop. The shop employs over 200 Partners and provides Waitrose internet food deliveries for most of west and central London from a dedicated site. The shop, whilst not open to the public, is laid out in a similar manner to a regular shop and even offers service counter lines, much like a normal Waitrose supermarket.

In March 2020, Waitrose announced that it was to add its Waitrose.com online delivery service to 24 more of its stores across the UK in preparation for its split with Ocado in September 2020.

Store closures 
Waitrose closed four convenience shops and one supermarket in the UK in 2018. This was followed by the announcement of twelve further store closures in 2019. In September 2020, a further four stores were announced as closing.

2014
 Dartford, Kent

2015
 Littlehampton, West Sussex. Re-located to Rustington

2016
 Leeds City Centre, West Yorkshire
 Tottenham Court Road, London

2017
 Cardiff Queen Street
 Hertford, Hertfordshire
 Huntingdon, Cambridgeshire
 Leek, Staffordshire. Re-opened as Lidl
 Palmers Green, London. Re-located to Winchmore Hill
 Staines-upon-Thames, Surrey. Re-opened as M&S Foodhall

2018
 Spinningfields, Manchester
 Manchester Piccadilly station
 Colmore Row, Birmingham.  Re-opened as Co-op 2019.
 Portman Square, London
 Camden Town, London

Spring 2019
 Torquay. Re-opened as Lidl June 2020.
 Teignmouth. Re-opened as Lidl January 2020.
 Blaby, Leicestershire
 Barry, Vale of Glamorgan
 Ashbourne, Derbyshire

Autumn 2019
 Bromley
 Oadby
 Wollaton
 Sandhurst
 Marlow
 Stevenage
 Waterside building (British Airways headquarters)

Spring 2020
Four Oaks
Helensburgh
Waterlooville

Autumn 2020

 Wolverhampton. Reopened as Tesco June 2021
 Shrewsbury
 Caldicot, Monmouthshire
 Ipswich, Corn Exchange

2022
Croydon, London
Newcastle, Tyne & Wear

Awards and acclaims 
Waitrose has received a number of awards. Its wines have been given awards by Decanter magazine and the International Wine and Spirit Competition. The supermarket chain has also received awards for its retail service, including awards from Which? magazine. Compassion in World Farming and the RSPCA have given Waitrose awards for animal welfare.

See also 

 List of supermarket chains in the United Kingdom
 Publix, a similar employee owned regional supermarket in the United States

References

External links 

 

1904 establishments in England
British Royal Warrant holders
Companies based in Bracknell
Employee-owned companies of the United Kingdom
John Lewis Partnership
Retail companies established in 1904
Supermarkets of the United Kingdom